Barrington Municipal High School (BMHS) is a secondary school located in Barrington Passage, Nova Scotia. BMHS is part of the Tri-County Regional School Board and is the only high school in the Municipality of the District of Barrington. The school moved from Barrington Passage to a new location at Riverhead in 2006.

Administration 

Cathy Breen - Principal
Phoebe Cameron - Vice Principal

External links
Barrington Municipal High School home page
Tri-County Regional School Board

High schools in Nova Scotia
Schools in Shelburne County, Nova Scotia